In Riemannian geometry, Cheng's eigenvalue comparison theorem states in general terms that when a domain is large, the first Dirichlet eigenvalue of its Laplace–Beltrami operator is small. This general characterization is not precise, in part because the notion of "size" of the domain must also account for its curvature. Using geodesic balls, it can be generalized to certain tubular domains .

Theorem
Let M be a Riemannian manifold with dimension n, and let BM(p, r) be a geodesic ball centered at p with radius r less than the injectivity radius of p ∈ M.  For each real number k, let N(k) denote the simply connected space form of dimension n and constant sectional curvature k. Cheng's eigenvalue comparison theorem compares the first eigenvalue λ1(BM(p, r)) of the Dirichlet problem in BM(p, r) with the first eigenvalue in BN(k)(r) for suitable values of k.  There are two parts to the theorem:

 Suppose that KM, the sectional curvature of M, satisfies

Then

The second part is a comparison theorem for the Ricci curvature of M:

 Suppose that the Ricci curvature of M satisfies, for every vector field X,

Then, with the same notation as above,

S.Y. Cheng used Barta's theorem to derive the eigenvalue comparison theorem. As a special case, if k = −1 and inj(p) = ∞, Cheng’s inequality becomes λ*(N) ≥ λ*(H n(−1)) which is McKean’s inequality.

See also
Comparison theorem
Eigenvalue comparison theorem

References

Citations

Bibliography 
 .
 .
 
 .
 .
 .
 /

Theorems in Riemannian geometry
Chinese mathematical discoveries